The New Jersey Sports Writers Association (NJSWA) was founded in 1936. The 75th Anniversary Banquet was held on Sunday, January 30, 2011, at The Pines Manor, Edison, New Jersey.

In January of each year, the NJSWA inducts into its hall of fame and presents awards for the preceding calendar year to various athletes, coaches, team executives, and other sports celebrities who either reside in, were born in, or played sports in New Jersey.

The NJSWA awards an annual scholarship to a resident of New Jersey who is majoring in journalism or media at a four-year university or college in New Jersey.

History
See footnote

Awards

1980–1989 awardees
1986
The 1986 awards were presented at the 51st Anniversary Banquet on February 1, 1987, at The Pines Manor, in Edison, N.J.
Pro Rookie of the Year – Mike Loynd, pitcher, Texas Rangers
College Player of the Year – Gordie Lockbaum, two-way, Holy Cross
College Offensive Player of the Year – Gregg Rakoczy, center, Miami University
College Defensive Player of the Year – Tyronne Stowe, linebacker, Rutgers University
New Jersey College Athlete of the Year (female) – Debbie Daniel, tennis, Trenton State College
New Jersey College Athlete of the Year (male) – Walter Briggs, quarterback, Montclair State
Man of the Year – Frank Cashen, general manager, New York Mets
Most Courageous Athlete – Jim Giglio, pitcher, Trenton State

1990–1999 awardees
1992
The 1992 awards were presented at the 57th Anniversary Banquet on
Meritorious Service Award – Florence K. Peragallo, retired associate director, NJSIAA

2000–2009 awardees
2001
The 2001 awards were presented at the 66th Anniversary Banquet on Sunday, January 27, 2002, at The Pines Manor, in Edison, N.J.
A.L. Manager of the Year – Tom Kelly, manager, Minnesota Twins
Pitching Coach of the Year – Rick Peterson, Oakland A's (born in New Brunswick)
Pro Cornerback of the Year – Troy Vincent, Philadelphia Eagles (born in Trenton; Thomas Edison State College)
Pro Soccer Player of the Year – Tim Howard, North Brunswick Township H.S., MetroStars
Pro Bowler of the Year – Carolyn Dorin-Ballard (born in Linden)
MVP – Dave Kennedy, New Jersey Jackals, North League champions
Minor League GM of the Year – Geoff Brown, Lakewood BlueClaws (SAL)
College Pitcher of the Year – Robert Brownlie, Rutgers baseball
Football Co-Player of the Year, NJAC – Ed Collins, quarterback, Montclair State University
Football Co-Player of the Year, NJAC – Tony Racioppi, quarterback, Rowan University
Distinguished Service to Hockey – Slava Fetisov, New Jersey Devils
Golden Bat Award – Jorge Posada, New York Yankees
Baseball Good Guy – Lee Mazzilli, New York Yankees
Good Guy – Michael Barrows, linebacker, New York Giants
Sports Humanitarian – Bobby Valentine, manager, New York Mets
Most Courageous Athlete – Tim Howard, North Brunswick Township H.S., MetroStars

2002
The 2002 awards were presented at the 67th Anniversary Banquet on Sunday, February 2, 2003, at The Pines Manor, in Edison, New Jersey.
Distinguished Service to Thoroughbred Racing – Robert Kulina, Monmouth Park's and Meadowlands general manager and vice president of Thoroughbred Racing

2003
The 2003 awards were presented at the 68th Anniversary Banquet on Sunday, January 24, 2004, at The Pines Manor, in Edison, New Jersey.
Coaching Legends Award – Charles Brown, New Jersey City University men's basketball

2008
The 2008 awards were presented at the 73rd Anniversary Banquet on Sunday, January 25, 2009, at The Pines Manor, in Edison, New Jersey.
Big East Conference Player of the Year – Mike Teel, Don Bosco Preparatory H.S., Rutgers football
College Softball Coach of the Year – Anita Kubicka, Montclair State
Sports Humanitarian of the Year – David Wright, New York Mets

2009
The 2009 awards were presented at the 74th Anniversary Banquet on Sunday, January 31, 2010, at The Pines Manor, in Edison, New Jersey.
Man of the Year – Bob Hurley, basketball coach, St. Anthony (Jersey City)
Woman of the Year – Christie Rampone, Point Pleasant Boro H.S., Monmouth University women's soccer, former captain of the U.S. World Cup Team, former player/coach of Sky Blue FC
Team of the Year – Sky Blue FC (Somerset)
Baseball Rookie of the Year – Rick Porcello, Seton Hall Prep, Detroit Tigers
NFL Rookie of the Year – Kenny Britt, Bayonne, Rutgers football, Tennessee Titans
College Men’s Basketball Player of the Year – Marqus Blakely, Metuchen H.S., University of Vermont
College Women’s Basketball Player of the Year – Hillary Klimowicz, Scotch Plains-Fanwood H.S., The College of New Jersey
College Football Player of the Year – Matt Szczur, Lower Cape May Regional H.S., Villanova
College Coach of the Year – Al Golden,  Red Bank Catholic H.S., Temple football
Standardbred Racing Man of the Year – Steve Elliott (resident of Cream Ridge)
Standardbred Racing Breeder of the Year – Ed Mullen (resident of Cream Ridge)
Standardbred Racing Breeder of the Year – Mark Mullen (resident of Cream Ridge)
Standardbred Racing Breeder of the Year – Steve Jones (resident of Cream Ridge)

2010-2019 awardees
2010
The 2010 awards were presented at the 75th Anniversary Banquet on Sunday, January 30, 2011, at The Pines Manor, in Edison, New Jersey.
Journalism Excellence – Frank Litsky, New York Times
Radio-TV Excellence – Steve "The Schmoozer" Somers, WFAN 660
Sports Woman of the Year – Anne Donovan, Paramus Catholic H.S., USA Olympian, Seton Hall women's basketball head coach
Standardbred Horseman of the Year – Brian Sears, driver
Women's Lacrosse College Player of the Year – Ali DeLuca, University of Pennsylvania
College Running Back of the Year – Andrew Pierce, Delaware
Women's College Coach of the Year – Courtney Banghart, Princeton women's basketball
Sports Executive of the Year – David Fay, retired executive director, United States Golf Association
New Jersey Coaching Legend – Bob Auriemma, Brick H.S. ice hockey
Sports Humanitarian of the Year – Eddie Lucas, Yankeemagazine.com
Eric LeGrand Courageous Athlete Award – Matt Hoffman, Rowan University

Hall of fame

2000-2009 inductees
2001
The 2001 inductees were inducted at the 66th Anniversary Banquet on Sunday, January 27, 2002, at The Pines Manor, in Edison, N.J.
Randy Beverly, Wildwood H.S., New York Jets
Chris Dailey, associate head coach, UConn women's basketball
Tom Kelly, manager, Minnesota Twins (and 2001 A.L. Manager of the Year)
Mike O'Koren, Hudson Catholic Regional H.S., University of North Carolina, New Jersey Nets
Andre Tippett, Barringer H.S. (Newark), New England Patriots
Willie Wilson, Summit H.S., Kansas City Royals

2003
The 2003 inductees were inducted at the 68th Anniversary Banquet on Sunday, January 24, 2004, at The Pines Manor, in Edison, New Jersey.
Charles Brown, All-Hudson County basketball player, Lincoln H.S. (Jersey City); point guard, Jersey City State College (now New Jersey City University) (1962–65); teacher and middle-school principal, Jersey City Public School System (19 -1998); head coach, Lincoln H.S. (1966–81); men’s basketball coach, New Jersey City University (1982-2007) (and 2003 Coaching Legends Award)
Bill Schutsky, Hillside H.S., Army men's basketball

2008
The 2008 inductees were inducted at the 73rd Anniversary Banquet on Sunday, January 25, 2009, at The Pines Manor, in Edison, New Jersey.
Warren Wolf, football coach, Brick Township H.S.

2009
The 2009 inductees were inducted at the 74th Anniversary Banquet on Sunday, January 31, 2010, at The Pines Manor, in Edison, New Jersey.
Lou Lamoriello, Devils CEO/President/GM

2010-2019 inductees
2010
The 2010 inductees were to be inducted at the 75th Anniversary Banquet on Sunday, January 30, 2011, at The Pines Manor, in Edison, New Jersey.
Bill Austin, 1958 All-American running back, Rutgers football
Geoff Billet, Christian Brothers Academy (CBA); 1995-99 guard and assistant coach (2000), Rutgers men's basketball; assistant coach, Monmouth University and Seton Hall University; head coach, CBA (2007–present)
Anne Donovan, Paramus Catholic H.S., USA Olympian, Seton Hall women's basketball head coach (and 2010 Sports Woman of the Year)
David Fay, United States Golf Association (and 2010 Sports Executive of the Year)
Fred Hill, Sr., head coach, Rutgers baseball
Leonard Marshall, defensive lineman, New York Giants
Eric Murdock, Bridgewater-Raritan H.S., Providence College All-American, NBA, Rutgers assistant coach, and Rutgers men’s basketball Director of Player Development
Tasha Pointer,  1997-2001 point guard, 1998 Big East Rookie of the Year, 1999 and 2001 All–Big East first team, Big East 25th Anniversary Hall of Fame Team (2003), assistant coach (2007–present), Rutgers women's basketball

Presidents
See footnote

1936 – Paul Horowitz, Newark Evening News
1937 – Ed Hill, Asbury Park Press
1938 – Art McMahon, Passaic Herald
1939–40 – Frank J. Fagan, Newark Star-Eagle
1941 – Bob Whiting, Paterson Morning Call
1942 – Gene Pinter, New Brunswick Home News
1943–45 – Sid Dorfman, Newark Star-Ledger
1946 – Louis Greenberg, Hudson Dispatch
1947 – Joe Lovas, Passaic Herald-News
1948 – Sam Siciliano, Asbury Park Press
1949–50 – George Lucas, Paterson Morning Call
1951 – Louis "Bud" Bauman, Elizabeth Journal
1952–54 – Joe McLaughlin, Newark Evening News
1955–56 – Carl Martin, Hudson Dispatch
1957 – Herb Nebel, Paterson Morning Call
1958–60 – Herb Stutz, Newark Evening News
1961–62 – Joe Lee, Asbury Park Press
1963–78 – Ed Nicheterlein, Atlantic City Press
1978–84 – Chuck Triblehorn, Red Bank Register
1984–90 – Joe Logue, The Trentonian
1990– (incl 2001) – Emery Konick Jr., The Home News Tribune
  (incl 2010)–present – George O'Gorman, The Trentonian

See also

National Sports Media Association (NSMA)
New York State Sportswriters Association
Philadelphia Sports Writers Association

References

External links
 

Sports in New Jersey
College sports in New Jersey
High school sports in New Jersey
American sports journalism organizations
Journalism-related professional associations
Non-profit organizations based in New Jersey
Sports organizations established in 1936
1936 establishments in New Jersey